Thaeme & Thiago is a Brazilian sertanejo country male-female duo made up of Thaeme Mariôto (known by her mononym Thaeme) and José Lazaro Servo (known by his stage name Thiago). It was formed in 2011. In 2013, it was announced that José Lazaro Servo was being replaced by Guilherme Bertoldo, but without altering the name of the duo.

Beginnings
Thaeme Fernanda Mariôto (born 4 October 1985) was the winner of season 2 of Ídolos broadcast on SBT in 2007. After her win, Sony BMG released her solo 5-track EP Ídolos: Thaeme including her winning song "Rotina". The release was a sold-out. The studio album Thaeme Mariôto: Tudo Certo (English: Thaeme Mariôto: All Right) was released in 5 December 2007 and two singles "Tudo Certo" and her own composition "Ironia". In 2009, she signed a new contract with Lua Music.

In 2011, she joined forces with José Lazaro Servo (born in Maringá on 27 February 1986), who had been sponsored at the beginning of his career by the established sertanejo duo Fernando & Sorocaba.

Duo career

2011–2013
Thaeme Mariôto and José Lazaro Servo joined forces to form a new male-female duo called Thaeme & Thiago. Their debut album, the 13-track release on 30 November 2011 titled Thaeme e Thiago was all composed by Thiago with notable singles being "Ai que dó", "Pisa que eu gamo", "Príncipe encantado", "Barraco" and "Perdeu" and collaborations with Fernando & Sorocaba and Marcos e Belutti. Based on the success, they released the live album Ao vivo em Londrina in 2012 with guest appearances by Gusttavo Lima, Cristiano Araújo and Fernando & Sorocaba and a second album Perto de Mim in 2013 with collaborations from Luan Santana and Marcos e Belutti.

Duo 2013–present
After José Lazaro Servo quitting the duo, he was replaced by Guilherme Bertoldo.

Prior to joining Thaeme & Thiago, Bertoldo had been part of Grupo Tradição alongside Jefferson Villalva, Wagner Pecóis, Leandro Azevedo, Leonardo Bertoldo and Márcio Adão Pereira, from 2008 onwards, replacing the hugely popular Michel Teló on lead vocals. Teló, lead vocals for the band had left to pursue a solo career after eleven years in the band (1997–2008). Transition had been smooth as Teló clearly explained that it was an amicable decision with no enmity or hard feelings. But Bertoldo couldn't enjoy a similar popularity and soon band members started quitting before the folding of the band.

Discography
(For Thaeme Mariôto solo discography of albums and singles, see her solo career page)

Studio albums

Singles

References

External links
Official website

Sertanejo music groups
Sertanejo musicians
Musical groups established in 2011
Brazilian musical duos
2011 establishments in Brazil